The 1946 Missouri Intercollegiate Athletic Association football season was the season of college football played by the six member schools of the Missouri Intercollegiate Athletic Association (MIAA) as part of the 1946 college football season. 

Southeast Missouri State compiled an 8–0–1 record, won the MIAA championship, led the conference in scoring offense and defense, and took six of eleven first-team spots on the 1946 All-MIAA football team. 

None of the MIAA teams was ranked in the Associated Press poll or played in a bowl game.

Conference overview

Teams

Southeast Missouri State

The 1946 Southeast Missouri State Indians football team was an American football team that represented Southeast Missouri State College at Cape Girardeau, Missouri (later renamed as Southeast Missouri State University) as a member of the Missouri Intercollegiate Athletics Association (MIAA) during the 1946 college football season. In their 14th and final season under head coach Abe Stuber, the Indians compiled an 8–0–1 record (5–0 against MIAA opponents), won the MIAA championship, shut out five of nine opponents, and outscored opponents by a total of 200 to 38.

Sourtheast Missouri took six of eleven first-team spots on the Associated Press 1946 All-MIAA football team: backs John Griffith and Webb Halbert; end Roscoe Branch; tackle Kenneth Knox; guard William Sapp; and center Donald Anderson. In addition, end Jack Klosterman and tackle Bill Lee were chosen for the second team.

Missouri Mines

The 1946 Missouri Mines Miners football team was an American football team that represented the Missouri School of Mines and Metallurgy at Rolla, Missouri (later renamed as Missouri University of Science and Technology) as a member of the Missouri Intercollegiate Athletics Association (MIAA) during the 1946 college football season. Led by head coach Gale Bullman, the Miners compiled a 4–3–2 record (3–1–1 against MIAA opponents), finished in second place in the MIAA, and were outscored by a total of 144 to 94.

Northeast Missouri State

The 1946 Northeast Missouri State Bulldogs football team was an American football team that represented the Northeast Missouri State College at Kirksville, Missouri (later renamed as Truman State University) as a member of the Missouri Intercollegiate Athletics Association (MIAA) during the 1946 college football season. Led by head coach Jim Dougherty, the Miners compiled a 5–2–2 record (2–1–2 against MIAA opponents), finished in third place in the MIAA, and were outscored by a total of 120 to 91.

Northwest Missouri State

The 1946 Northwest Missouri State Bearcats football team was an American football team that represented the Northwest Missouri State College at Maryville, Missouri (later renamed Northwest Missouri State University) as a member of the Missouri Intercollegiate Athletics Association (MIAA) during the 1946 college football season. In their ninth season under head coach Ryland Milner, the Bearcats compiled a 4–3 record (2–3 against MIAA opponents), finished in fourth place in the MIAA, and outscored opponents by a total of 63 to 57.

Southwest Missouri State

The 1946 Southwest Missouri State Bears football team was an American football team that represented the Southwest Missouri State College at Springfield, Missouri (later renamed Missouri State University) as a member of the Missouri Intercollegiate Athletics Association (MIAA) during the 1946 college football season. In their seventh and final season under head coach Red Blair, the Bears compiled a 3–6 record (1–4 against MIAA opponents), finished in fifth place in the MIAA, and were outscored by a total of 132 to 76.

Central Missouri State

The 1946 Central Missouri State Mules football team was an American football team that represented the Central Missouri State College at Warrensburg, Missouri (later renamed University  of Central Missouri) as a member of the Missouri Intercollegiate Athletics Association (MIAA) during the 1946 college football season. Led by head coach Judd Dean, the Mules compiled a 2–5–1 record (0–4–1 against MIAA opponents), finished in last place in the MIAA, and were outscored by a total of 111 to 47.

All-conference team
The Associated Press (AP) selected a 1946 All-MIAA football team consisting of a first team and a second team. The AP selections were as follows: 

First team
 Backs: John Griffith, Cape  Girardeau; Webb Halbert, Cape Girardeau; Paul Fulop, Rolla; Darrell Gourley, Kirksvile
 Ends: Stan Totoratis, Maryville; Roscoe Branch, Cape Girardeau
 Tackles: Kenneth Knox, Cape Girardeau; Ken Gardner, Kirksville
 Guards: William Sapp, Cape Girardeau; Gale Gulgham, Rolla
 Center: Donald Anderson, Cape Girardeau

Second team
 Backs: Buck Stamp, Warrensburg; Paul Gates, Maryville; Len Crase, Springfield; Gilbert Garafiol, Rolla
 Ends: Jack Klosterman, Cape Girardeau; John Lanahan, Maryville
 Tackles: Bill Lee, Cape Girardeau; Anton Leone, Rolla
 Guards: Dick Kerin, Springfield; Ed Paule, Warrensburg
 Center: John Spainhower, Kirksville

References